Effingham Lake is a  lake located on Vancouver Island at the head of Effingham River and north east of Kennedy Lake.

References

Alberni Valley
Lakes of Vancouver Island
Clayoquot Land District